Barrie Michael Hough (17 January 1953 – 17 August 2004) was a South African writer who wrote children's stories. He wrote in Afrikaans, and almost all of his works have been translated into English. He was joint winner of the Alba Bouwer Prize in 1990 for his work Droomwa. He also won the Sanlam Prize for Youth Literature for Droomwa in 1990 and the CP Hoogenhout Award that same year.

Publications 

 My cat Becomes Autumn (1986)
 Droomwa (1990)
 Wing Dance (1992)
 Skimmelstreke (1995)
 Turtles (1998)
 Break (2002) – with Lizz Meiring

Death 
Hough suffered from depression and committed suicide in 2004 at the age of 51.

Awards
1990: Joint winner, Alba Bouwer Prize for Droomwa
1990: Sanlam Prize for Youth Literature,  for Droomwa
1990:(  CP Hoogenhout Award that same year

References 

2004 deaths
South African writers
Afrikaans-language writers
1953 births
Suicides in South Africa